The Tejano Music Award for Tejano Album of the Year (formerly the Tejano Music Award for Best Tejano/Norteño Album) is an honor presented annually by the Texas Talent Musicians Association (TTMA). The award was first presented at the 23rd Tejano Music Awards (TMA) and was not given out at the 24th and 29th awards ceremony. Previously, musicians who predominantly record Tejano recordings were nominated for either the Tejano Music Award for Best Conjunto Album, Orchestra Album of the Year, Album of the Year – Traditional, or Album of the Year – Progressive, depending on their style of music: conjunto, cumbia, pop ballads, or polka music. Since the genre's popularity faded after the mid-1990s, the TMAs either merged or retired the over-categorization of their album-of-the-year categories through the 2000s decade. The record and current holder of the award is Elida Reyna, who won four non-consecutive times. The Tejano Music Award for Tejano Urban Album of the Year was a subcategory of the award and included nominations from musicians who recorded urbanized Tejano recordings; this was awarded to musicians at the 25th and 26th awards ceremony. No artist won twice, though DJ Kane remains the only musician to have been nominated twice for the award.

Recipients

Urban Tejano

References

External links
Official site of the Tejano Music Awards

Album of the Year - Tejano
Awards disestablished in 2015
Awards established in 2003
Album awards